Everybody Works is the second studio album by indie music artist Jay Som, released on March 10, 2017 by Double Denim Records and Polyvinyl Record Co. Everybody Works has received acclaim from music critics.

Critical reception

At Metacritic, which assigns a normalized rating out of 100 to reviews from mainstream critics, Everybody Works received an average score of 82, based on 12 reviews, indicating "universal acclaim". Judy Berman, writing for Pitchfork, gave Everybody Works a positive review, stating, "Everybody Works is a careful, wise, and excellent album. It's not bedroom pop because it sounds a certain way, but because it feels so intimate"; she gave the album a "Best New Music" designation. Jody Amable, writing for Consequence of Sound, said, "Everybody Works is the next logical half-step from her Polyvinyl debut, Turn Into. That record was a hushed affair, mainly carried out in either softly-delivered vocals or a dose of distortion. The tender tendencies are still there, but she's singing with slightly more force than last time. Jay Som has built upon her established identity as a skilled songwriter with a long future ahead of her to craft a varied and vibrant record that's a steady, reliably smart listen from start to end."

Accolades

Track listing

Personnel
Melina Duterte – vocals, guitar, keyboards (2, 3, 5, 6, 8, 9), piano (1, 2, 5, 10), bass (2-6, 8-10), drums (2-6, 8-10), percussion (2, 5, 8, 9), accordion (1, 10), trumpet (2, 10)
Zachary Elsasser – vocals on 2, 3, 5, 6, 8, 9, 10
Oliver Pinnell – vocals on 3, 4, 5, 8, 9, 10
Dylan Allard – vocals on 2, 3, 8, 9, 10

Charts

References

2017 albums
Jay Som albums